The William Luther House is a historic house in Swansea, Massachusetts.  It is a -story wood-frame Cape style house, five bays wide, with a side-gable roof, central chimney, clapboard siding on the front and wooden shingles on the sides.  The front door is an original vertical board door.  An ell extends to the rear of the house, added in the late 19th or early 20th century.  The house was built c. 1849, and is a well-preserved example of Greek Revival styling.  The house was for many years owned by members of the locally prominent Buffington family.

The house was listed on the National Register of Historic Places in 1990.

See also
National Register of Historic Places listings in Bristol County, Massachusetts

References

Houses in Bristol County, Massachusetts
Swansea, Massachusetts
Houses on the National Register of Historic Places in Bristol County, Massachusetts